Emily Carroll (born 1983) is a comics author from Ontario, Canada. Carroll started making comics in 2010, and her horror webcomic His Face All Red went viral around Halloween of 2010. Since then, Carroll has published two books of her own work, created comics for various comics anthologies, and provided illustrations for other works. Carroll has won several awards, including an Ignatz and two Eisners.

Career
Carroll is educated as an animator. She began drawing comics in 2010.

Webcomics 
Carroll drew and published her first comic on her website in May 2010. Her third webcomic, His Face All Red, was released on October 31, 2010, and soon went viral.

Carroll has continued to publish short horror comics on her website. For her 2014 webcomic The Hole the Fox Did Make, Carroll chose for a limited format to see how she could create unease in a limited space. Furthermore, she created this webcomic during breaks between other work, and the format facilitated drawing in "small chunks". Another webcomic, Margot's Room, presents the reader with a child's bedroom; clicking on objects in the room presents a part of the story. A poem at the start suggest a reading order, but the comic can be read in any order. Her 2016 webcomic Some Other Animal's Meat was adapted as "The Outside" for the Netflix horror anthology Guillermo del Toro's Cabinet of Curiosities (2022).

, the latest webcomic on her website is The Worthington, published in 2018.

Print 
Carroll's work has been included in a number of comic anthologies, including "Explorer: Mystery Boxes," "Fairy Tale Comics," "Creepy" and "The Witching Hour."

In 2014, Carroll published Through the Woods, an anthology book of four original stories and an adaptation of His Face All Red for print format. According to CBR, this was first announced in 2011 and was to be titled "His Face All Red and Other Stories". When talking about adapting a webcomic to print, Carroll said, "it was difficult... I think it works pretty good, though I think it might be more successful on the screen, to be honest. Because page turns became really important. With horror comics or any sort of suspense comics, if you have a set up for a scare on the left-hand page and the scare itself on the right-hand page the effect would disappear immediately." Through the Woods won Eisner, Ignatz, and British Fantasy awards.

Carroll illustrated the 2015 graphic novel Baba Yaga's Assistant from Candlewick Press and a graphic novel adaptation of Speak. In 2019, she published When I Arrived at the Castle, a graphic novel which she wrote and illustrated.

Illustrations for other works 
Carroll created illustrations for the 2013 indie video games Gone Home and The Yawhg.

Reviews 
Articles at CBR have described Carroll as a "webcomics wunderkind" and "a master of atmosphere and mood". They have called her webcomics "deliciously dark", praising her "vibrant colors, exquisite pacing, and genuinely creepy, genuinely bleak stories of murder and monstrousness". The magazine Room said of her work, "Her beautiful, yet delicately sinister, fairy-tale comics evoke a feeling of isolation that twists into suspense as the reader clicks and scrolls through a horror story and that lingers in the mind long after the final panel." It also highlighted themes of isolation and guilt that appear throughout her work, as well as her preference for ambiguous endings. Paste Magazine called her comic The Hole the Fox Did Make one of the best webcomics of 2014.

The critic Joe McCulloch said of Carroll's His Face All Red, “Even in the late ’80s, guys like Stephen Bissette were developing forums like Taboo which were specifically designed to counteract the traditionalism of comics horror … ‘His Face All Red’ seemed a break from that when it hit me. And it hit a lot of people.”

Carroll's 2019 book, When I Arrived at the Castle, received positive reviews. The Comics Journal said that Carrol has an "incredible capacity to scare" and that "while there is a moral, Carroll deftly avoids moralizing. At no point does she offer a neat resolution—the victimizer is condemned, of course, but the victim is not necessarily absolved completely." A review for Women Write About Comics called it a "dark, delicious fantasy" and said, "It’s the kind of story that needs multiple readings, not because it’s confusing, but because there’s so much to unravel, so much thematic detail to sift through." PopMatters rated it 8 out of 10, and said that "Carrol's style remains familiar: deceptively cartoonish figures that evoke a children's picture book despite the puddles of blood oozing into the gutters. Not that there are many gutters. Carroll prefers ever-changing layouts that only rarely provide traditional panels or grids."

Awards 
 Emily Carroll won two Joe Shuster Awards in the category "Outstanding Web Comics Creator", in 2011 and 2012 respectively.
The 2011 award recognised her works of the previous year, which were His Face All Red, Dream Journals, The Death of José Arcadio, Out the Door, and The Hare’s Bride. The 2012 award noted her work Margot's Room.
 At the 2014 Doug Wright Awards, Carroll won the Pigskin Peters Award, which "recognizes the best in experimental, non-traditional or avant-garde comics". She was also nominated for the Doug Wright Spotlight Award in 2012.
 Carroll won two Eisner Awards in 2015: one in the "Best Graphic Album-Reprint" category for Through the Woods, and one in the "Best Short Story" category for When the Darkness Presses.
 Carroll won an Ignatz Award in the "Outstanding Artist" category in 2015 for Through the Woods.
 Carroll won the British Fantasy Award for "Best Comic/Graphic Novel" in 2015 for Through the Woods.

Personal life 
Carroll was born in London, Ontario. Her parents divorced when she was in high school. As of 2014, she is based in Stratford, Ontario. She is married to Kate Craig.

Bibliography
Through the Woods. New York: Margaret K. McElderry Books. 2014. , 
"Ann by the Bed" (Frontier #6). San Francisco: Youth in Decline. 2014. 
Marika McCoola; Emily Carroll (2015). Baba Yaga's Assistant. Somerville: Candlewick Press. , .
"Beneath the Dead Oak Tree". Leeds: Shortbox. 2018. 
Laurie Halse Anderson; Emily Carroll (2018). Speak: The Graphic Novel. New York: Farrar, Straus and Giroux. , 
When I Arrived at the Castle. Toronto: Koyama Press. 2019. ,

References

External links 
 

Year of birth uncertain
Artists from London, Ontario
Canadian comics artists
Canadian comics writers
Canadian graphic novelists
Canadian horror writers
Canadian webcomic creators
Canadian female comics artists
Female comics writers
Horror artists
Ignatz Award winners for Outstanding Artist
Joe Shuster Award winners for Outstanding WebComic Creator/Creative Team
Living people
Canadian LGBT artists
Canadian LGBT writers
LGBT comics creators
Women horror writers
Writers from London, Ontario
1983 births